Pasi Rasimus (born 6 March 1962) is a retired Finnish football midfielder. Being capped for Finland and playing abroad with Lillestrøm, he was sacked by Lillestrøm after riding in teammate Ivaylo Kirov' car; Kirov hit a pedestrian while both players were under the influence. In Finland he played for Helsingin Jalkapalloklubi, Turun Palloseura and FinnPa.

References

1962 births
Living people
Finnish footballers
Helsingin Jalkapalloklubi players
Turun Palloseura footballers
Lillestrøm SK players
FinnPa players
Association football midfielders
Finnish expatriate footballers
Expatriate footballers in Norway
Finnish expatriate sportspeople in Norway
Eliteserien players
Finland international footballers
Footballers from Helsinki
20th-century Finnish people